The Ridda Wars were a series of military campaigns launched by the first caliph Abu Bakr against rebellious Arabian tribes. They began shortly after the death of the Islamic prophet Muhammad in 632 and concluded the next year, with all battles won by the Rashidun Caliphate. These wars secured the caliphate's control over Arabia and restored its nascent prestige.

During Muhammad's lifetime, many Arab rebels declared themselves prophets. After Muhammad died in June 632, Abu Bakr was elected as the caliph of the Muslim community at Saqifah. The next day, he launched a successful expedition into the Byzantine Syria. Meanwhile in Arabia, the self-proclaimed prophets started to cause mischief and arranged rebellions against Abu Bakr. The first attack on the caliphate was done by Tulayha, who prepared an army in an attempt to capture Medina, the capital of the caliphate. This was a major failure as Tulayha's forces were crushed in Zhuqissa. In the battle, Tulayha retreated and then again attacked the Muslims at Abraq and Buzakha, both were unsuccessful attempts. After the defeat, Tulayha became a Muslim, though this was not enough to stop the rise of more self-proclaimed prophets. 

In September 632, Banu Azd's chief Laqit prepared an army to attack Oman. However, the commander Hudayfa's forces defeated Laqit and his army. The next month, attacks were faced in Northern Arabia and Yemen, though they were easily defeated. Few months later, Banu Hanifa's chief Musaylimah, with an army 40,000 soldiers was killed in the Battle of Yamama. The last major attack was done by the powerful tribe of Kinda in Hadhramaut in January 633. The campaigns came to end in June 633 as Abu Bakr successfully united all tribes of Arabia.

The Rashidun Caliphate secured its control by defeating the rebel tribes. These military campaigns are regarded by historians as Abu Bakr's greatest political and military triumph. These wars also cemented Khalid ibn al-Walid's reputation as a great tactician and cavalry commander. A detailed reconstruction of the events is complicated by the frequently contradictory and tendentious accounts found in primary sources.

Background

In May 632, Muhammad ordered a large expedition to be prepared against the Byzantine Empire in order to avenge the martyrs of the Battle of Mu'tah. He appointed Usama ibn Zayd, the son of Zayd ibn Harithah who was killed in the Battle at Mu'tah, as commander of this force so he could avenge the death of his father. However, as Muhammad was ailing, the expedition was delayed. In June 632, Muhammad died and Abu Bakr was chosen as the caliph at Saqifah.

On the first day of his caliphate, Abu Bakr ordered the army of Usama to prepare for march. Abu Bakr was under great pressure regarding this expedition due to rising rebellion, people who withheld zakat and apostasy across Arabia, but he was determined. Before his march, Usama sent Umar to Abu Bakr and is reported to have said:

Abu Bakr however refused his demands. On June 26, 632, the army of Usama broke camp and moved out. After leaving Medina, Usama marched to Tabuk where most of the tribes in the region opposed him fiercely, but were defeated. Usama raided far and wide in the region of Northern Arabia, starting with the Quza'a, and then made his way to Dawmatu l-Jandal (modern Al Jawf, Saudi Arabia). Usama next marched to Mu'tah, attacked the Christian Arabs of the tribes of Banu Kalb and the Ghassanids in a small battle. Then he returned to Medina, bringing with him a large number of captives and a considerable amount of wealth, part of which comprised the spoils of war and part taxation of the re-conquered tribes. The Islamic army remained out of Medina for 40 days. This expedition became notable in Islam history since the eighteen year old Usama were appointed as overall commander, leading veterans and high ranked Companions of the Prophet such as Umar, Sa'd ibn Abi Waqqas, Sa'id ibn Zayd, Abu Ubayda ibn al-Jarrah, and Qatada ibn al-Nu'man as his subordinates.

Usama expedition succeeded to force several rebel tribes resubmitted to Medinian rule and claimed that they re-accepted Islam. The Quza'a remained rebellious and unrepentant, but 'Amr ibn al-'As later attacked them and forced them to surrender again.

Meanwhile, the apostates from Ghatafan clan from Qays tribe attempted several times to capture Mecca, which still loyal to Islam, before joining the apostate leader on the north, Tulayha of the Banu Asad.

Ridda campaign 

In the fourth week of August 632, Abu Bakr moved to Zhu Qissa with all available fighting forces. There he planned his strategy, in what would later be called the Campaign of Apostasy, to deal with the various enemies who occupied the rest of Arabia. The battles which he had fought recently against the apostate concentrations at Zhu Qissa and Abraq were in the nature of defensive actions to protect Medina and discourage further offensives by the enemy. These actions enabled Abu Bakr to secure a base from which he could fight the major campaign that lay ahead, thus gaining time for the preparation and launching of his main forces.

Abu Bakr had to fight not one but several enemies: Tulayha at Buzakha, Malik bin Nuwaira at Butah, and Musaylima at Yamamah. He had to deal with widespread apostasy on the eastern and southern coasts of Arabia: in Bahrain, in Oman, in Mahra, in Hadhramaut and in Yemen. There was apostasy in the region south and east of Mecca and by the Quza'a in northern Arabia.

Abu Bakr formed the army into several corps, the strongest of which was commanded by Khalid ibn Walid and assigned to fight the most powerful of the rebel forces. Other corps were given areas of secondary importance in which to subdue the less dangerous apostate tribes, and were dispatched after Khalid, according to the outcome of his operations.  Abu Bakr's plan was first to clear west-central Arabia (the area nearest to Medina), then tackle Malik bin Nuwaira, and finally concentrate against the most dangerous and powerful enemy: the self-proclaimed prophet Musaylima.

Defence of Medina
In July 632, Abu Bakr sent envoys to the enemy tribes, calling upon them to remain loyal to Islam and continue to pay their zakat. This demand was rejected by the rebellious tribes. The self-proclaimed prophet Tulayha reinforced an army at Zhu Qissa, a city about thirty miles east of Medina. From there, Tulayha and his forces were preparing to launch an attack on Medina.

Abu Bakr received intelligence of the rebel movements, and immediately prepared for the defence of Medina. Ibn Kathir recorded that Abu Bakr immediately formed newly organised elite guard unit al-Ḥaras wa al-Shurṭa to defend Medina. Veteran companions like Ali ibn Abi Talib, Talha ibn Ubayd Allah and Zubayr ibn al-Awwam were appointed as commanders of these units. The Haras wa'l Shurta troops rode their camels to the mountain passes of Medina at night, intercepting the Apostate coalition assault forces, until the enemy retreated to Dhu Qisha.

Battle of Zhuqissa 
The following day, Abu Bakr marched the garrison troops from Medina with the main army and moved towards Dhu Hussa. As the riding military camels were all with Usama's army, he could only muster pack camels as mounts. These pack camels, being untrained for battle, bolted when Hibal, the apostate commander at Zhu Hussa, made a surprise attack from the hills; as a result, the Muslims cannot control their untrained Camels and decided to retreat toward Medina, and the apostates recaptured the outposts that they lost a few days earlier. At Medina, Abu Bakr reorganised the army for battle and attacked the apostates during the night, taking them by surprise. The apostates retreated from Dhu Hussa to Dhu Qissa. The defeated apostate tribes retreated to Abraq, where more clansmen of the Ghatfan, the Hawazin, and the Tayy were gathered. Abu Bakr left a residual force under the command of An-Numan ibn Muqarrin at Dhu Qissa and returned with his main army to Medina.

Battle of Abraq 
On 4 August 632, Usama's army returned to Medina.  Abu Bakr ordered Usama to rest and resupply his men there for future operations. Meanwhile, in the second week of August 632, Abu Bakr moved his army to Zhu Qissa. Merging An-Numan ibn Muqarrin's remaining forces with his own, Abu Bakr then moved to Abraq, where the retreated rebels had gathered. The following morning, Abu Bakr led his forces to Dhu Qissa, with the composition Abu Bakr himself at lead the center, while Al-Nu'man ibn Muqrin ride in the right flank, Abdullah ibn Muqrin on the left flank, and Suwaid ibn Muqrin positioned in the rear. The Medinan forces drove the rebel tribes, capturing Dhu Qissa on 1 August 632. The remaining rebels retreated to Buzakha, where Tulayha had moved with his army from Samira.

Battle of Buzakha 
On receiving intelligence of the Muslim preparations, Tulayha too prepared for battle, and was further reinforced by the contingents of the allied tribes. Before dispatching Khalid against Tulayha, Abu Bakr sought to reduce the latter's strength. Nothing could be done about the tribes of Bani Assad and Banu Ghatafan, which stood solidly behind Tulayha, but the Tayy were not so staunch in their support of Tulayha, and their chief, Adi ibn Hatim, was a devout Muslim. Adi was appointed by Abu Bakr to negotiate with the tribal elders to withdraw their contingent from Tulayha's army. The negotiations were a success, and Adi brought with him 500 horsemen of his tribe to reinforce Khalid's army. Khalid next marched against another apostate tribe, Jadila. Here again Adi ibn Hatim offered his services to persuade the tribe to submit without bloodshed. Bani Jadila submitted, and their 1000 warriors joined Khalid's army.

Khalid, now much stronger than when he had left Zhu Qissa, marched for Buzakha. There, in mid-September 632 CE, he defeated Tulayha in the Battle of Buzakha. The remnants of Tulayha's army retreated to Ghamra, 20 miles from Buzakha, and were defeated in the Battle of Ghamra in the third week of September.

Several tribes submitted to the Caliph after Khalid's decisive victories. Moving south from Buzakha, Khalid reached Naqra in October, with an army now 6000 strong, and defeated the rebel tribe of Banu Saleem in the Battle of Naqra. In the third week of October, Khalid defeated a tribal chieftess, Salma, in the battle of Zafar. Afterwards he moved to Najd against the rebel tribe of Banu Tamim and their Sheikh Malik ibn Nuwayrah.

Caliphate army divisions 

The caliph distributed the available manpower among 11 main corps, each under its own commander, and bearing its own standard. The available manpower was distributed among these corps, and while some commanders were given immediate missions, others were given missions to be launched later. The commanders and their assigned objectives were:

 Khalid Ibn Walid: Move against Tulaiha bin Khuwailad Al-Asdee (طُلیحة بن خویلد الاسدی) from the Asad Tribe (بنو اسد) at Buzaakhah (بزاخة),then Banu Sulaim .
 Ikrimah ibn Abi-Jahl: Confront Musaylima at Yamamah but not to engage until more forces were built up.
 Amr ibn al-As: The apostate tribes of Quza'a and Wadi'a in the area of Tabuk and Daumat-ul-Jandal.
 Shurahbil ibn Hasana: Follow Ikrimah and await the Caliph's instructions.
 Khalid bin Saeed: Certain apostate tribes on the Syrian frontier.
 Turaifa bin Hajiz: The apostate tribes of Hawazin and Bani Sulaim in the area east of Medina and Mecca.
 Ala bin Al Hadhrami: The apostates in Bahrain.
 Hudhaifa bin Mihsan: The apostates in Oman.
 Arfajah: The apostates in Mahra.
 Muhajir bin Abi Umayyah: The apostates in the Yemen, then the Kinda in Hadhramaut.
 Suwaid bin Muqaran: The apostates in the coastal area north of the Yemen.

As soon as the organisation of the corps was complete, Khalid marched off, to be followed a little later by Ikrimah and 'Amr ibn al-'As. The other corps were held back by the caliph and dispatched weeks and even months later, according to the progress of Khalid's operations against the hard core of enemy opposition.

Before the various corps left Zhu Qissa, however, envoys were sent by Abu Bakr to all apostate tribes in a final attempt to induce them to submit.

Central Arabia
Apostasy and rebellion in central Arabia was led by Musaylima, a self-proclaimed prophet, in the fertile region of Yamamah. He was mainly supported by the powerful tribe of Banu Hanifa. At Buzakha in north central Arabia, another self-proclaimed prophet, Tulayha, a tribal chief of Banu Asad, led the rebellion against Medina aided by the allied tribes of Banu Ghatafan, the Hawazin, and the Tayy.

Najd

At Najd, on learning of Khalid's decisive victories against apostates in Buzakha, many clans of Banu Tamim hastened to visit Khalid, but the Bani Yarbu', a branch of Bani Tamim, under their chief, Malik ibn Nuwayrah, hung back. Malik was a chief of some distinction: a warrior, noted for his generosity, and a famous poet. Bravery, generosity, and poetry were the three qualities most admired among the Arabs.

At the time of Muhammad, he had been appointed as a tax collector for the tribe of Banu Tamim. As soon as Malik heard of the death of Muhammad, he gave back all the tax to his tribespeople, saying, "Now you are the owner of your wealth." Most scholars agreed that he was adhering to the normal beliefs of the Arabs of his time in which they could cease to pledge their allegiance to a tribe upon the death of its Sheikh.

His riders were stopped by Khalid's army at the town of Buttah. Khalid asked them about the pact they signed with the self-proclaimed prophetess Sajjah; they responded it was merely for revenge against their enemies.

When Khalid reached Najd he found no opposing army. He sent his cavalry to nearby villages and ordered them to call the Azaan (call to prayer) to each party they met. Zirrar bin Azwar, a squadron leader, arrested the family of Malik, claiming they did not answer the call to prayer.
Malik avoided direct contact with Khalid's army and ordered his followers to scatter, and he and his family apparently moved away across the desert. He refused to give zakat, differentiating between prayer and zakat.

Nevertheless, Malik was accused of rebellion against the state of Medina.  He was also to be charged for his entering into the alliance with Sajjah against the Caliphate.  Malik was arrested along with those of his clan.

Malik was asked by Khalid about his crimes, and responded, "your master said this, your master said that", referring to Muhammad. Khalid declared Malik a rebel apostate and ordered his execution.

Yamamah

Ikrimah ibn Abi-Jahl, one of the corps commanders, was instructed to make contact with Musaylima at Yamamah, but not to engage until Khalid joined him. Abu Bakr's intention in giving Ikrimah this mission was to tie Musaylima down at Yamamah, thereby freeing Khalid to deal with the apostate tribes of north-central Arabia without interference.

Meanwhile, Abu Bakr sent Shurhabil's corps to reinforce Ikrimah at Yamamah.  Ikrimah, however, in early September 632, attacked Musaylima's forces before the reinforcements arrived, and was defeated. He reported his actions to Abu Bakr, who, both pained and angered by the rashness of Ikrimah and his disobedience, ordered him to proceed with his force to Oman to assist Hudaifa; once Hudaifa had completed his task, he was to march to Mahra to help Arfaja, and thereafter go to Yemen to help Muhajir.

Meanwhile, Abu Bakr sent orders to Khalid to march against Musaylima. Shurhabil's corps, stationed at Yamamah, was to reinforce Khalid's corps. In addition to this Abu Bakr assembled a fresh army of Ansar and Muhajireen in Medina that joined Khalid's corps at Butah before the combined force set out for Yamamah.

Though Abu Bakr had instructed Shurhabil not to engage Musaylima's forces until Khalid's arrival, Shurhabil engaged Musaylima's forces anyway and was defeated, too. Khalid linked up with the remnants of Shurhabil's corps early in December 632.

The combined force of Muslims, now 13,000 strong, finally defeated Musaylima's army in the Battle of Yamama, which was fought in the third week of December. The fortified city of Yamamah surrendered peacefully later that week.

Khalid established his headquarters at Yamamah, from which he despatched columns throughout the plain of Aqraba to subdue the region around Yamamah. Thereafter, all of central Arabia submitted to Medina.

What remained of the apostasy in the less vital areas of Arabia was rooted out by the Muslims in a series of well-planned campaigns within five months.

Oman

In mid-September 632, Abu Bakr dispatched Hudaifa bin Mihsan's corps to tackle the apostasy in Oman, where the dominant tribe of Azd had revolted under their chief Laqeet bin Malik, known more commonly as "Dhu'l-Taj" ("the Crowned One"). According to some reports, he also claimed prophethood.

Hudaifa entered Oman, but not having sufficient strength to fight Dhu'l-Taj, he requested reinforcements from the Caliph, who sent Ikrimah from Yamamah to aid him in late September. The combined forces then defeated Dhu'l-Taj at a battle at Dibba, one of Dhu'l-Taj's strongholds, in November. Dhu'l-Taj himself was killed in the battle.

Hudaifa was appointed governor of Oman, and set about the re-establishment of law and order. Ikrimah, having no local administrative responsibility, used his corps to subdue the area around Daba, and, in a number of small actions, succeeded in breaking the resistance of those Azd who had continued to defy the authority of Medina.

Northern Arabia
Some time in October 632, Amr's corps was dispatched to the Syrian border to subdue the apostate tribes—most importantly, the Quza'a and the Wadi'a (a part of the Bani Kalb)--in the region around Tabuk and Daumat-ul-Jandal (Al-Jawf). Amr was not able to beat the tribes into submission until Shurhabil joined him in January after the Battle of Yamamah.

Yemen
The Yemen had been the first province to rebel against the authority of Islam when the tribe of Ans rose in arms under the leadership of its chief and self-proclaimed prophet Al-Aswad Al-Ansi, the Black One. Yemen was controlled then by Al-Abna', a group descended from the Sasanian Persian garrison in Sanaa. When Badhan died, his son Shahr partially became governor of Yemen but was killed by Al-Aswad. Al-Aswad was later killed by Fayruz al-Daylami, also an abna' member, who was sent by Muhammad, and thereafter Fairoz acted as governor of Yemen at San'a.

Second rebellion of Yemen 
In the later phase after the death of Aswad al-Ansi, two Yemenite chieftains, Amr ibn Ma'adi Yakrib and his nephew, Qays ibn Makshuh revolted against Fairuz. At first, Amr and Qays supported the caliphate suppression of Aswad rebellion. However, both Amr and Qays later revolted against the caliphate as both did not agree with new administrator appointed by the caliph, thus they seceded from leadership of Farwah, who acted as their regions governor at the time. Amr and Qays ibn Maksuh then conspired to kill three caliphate deputies in Yemen.

A caliphate commander Al-Muhajir ibn Abi Umayya lead the Al-Abna' opposing Qays. Ultimately, the forces of Qays and Amr were defeated by the force of Ikrima ibn Abi Jahl. Amr and Qays were said to be captured by Fayruz al-Daylami. According to the record of Usd al-ghabah fi marifat al-Saḥabah, Amr came to Medina as prisoner, guarded by a caliphate soldier named Al-Muhajir ibn Abi Umayya. Amr then was brought before caliph Abu Bakar, who invited him to believe in Islam again, which Amr agreed upon. Thus, Amr was pardoned by the caliph.

Mahra
From Oman, following the orders of Abu Bakr, Ikrimah marched to Mahra to join Arfaja bin Harthama. As Arfaja had not yet arrived, Ikrimah, instead of waiting for him, tackled the local rebels on his own.

At Jairut, Ikrimah met two rebel armies preparing for battle. Here he persuaded the weaker to embrace Islam and then joined up with them to defeat their opponents.
Having re-established Islam in Mahra, Ikrimah moved his corps to Abyan, where he rested his men and awaited further developments.

Bahrain
After the Battle of Yamamah, Abu Bakr sent Ala bin Al Hadhrami's corps against the rebels of Bahrain. Ala arrived in Bahrain to find the apostate forces gathered at Hajr and entrenched in a strong position. Ala mounted a surprise attack one night and captured the city. The rebels retreated to the coastal regions, where they made one more stand but were decisively defeated. Most of them surrendered and reverted to Islam. This operation was completed at about the end of January 633.

Hadhramaut
The last of the great revolts of the apostasy was that of the powerful tribe of Kinda, which inhabited the region of Najran, Hadhramaut, and eastern Yemen. They did not break into revolt until January 633.

Ziyad bin Lubaid, Muslim governor of Hadhramaut, operated against them and raided Riyaz, after which the whole of the Kinda broke into revolt under al-Ash'ath ibn Qays and prepared for war. However, the strength of the two forces, i.e. apostate and Muslim, was so well balanced that neither side felt able to start serious hostilities. Ziyad waited for reinforcements before attacking the rebels.

Reinforcements were on the way. al-Muhajir ibn Abi Umayya, the last of the corps commanders to be despatched by Abu Bakr, defeated some rebel tribes in Najran, south-eastern Arabia, and was directed by Abu Bakr to march to Hadhramaut and join Ziyad against the Kinda. The Caliph also instructed Ikrimah, who was at Abyan, to join Ziyad and Muhajir's forces.

In late January 633 the forces of Muhajir and Ziyad combined at Zafar, capital of Hadhramaut, under the overall command of the former, and defeated al-Ash'ath, who retreated to the fortified town of Nujair.

Just after this battle the corps of Ikrimah also arrived. The three Muslim corps, under the overall command of Muhajir, advanced on Nujair and laid siege to the fortified city.

Nujair was captured some time in mid-February 633. With the defeat of the Kinda at Nujair the last of the great apostate movements collapsed. Arabia was safe for Islam.

The Campaign of the Apostasy was fought and completed during the 11th year of the Hijra. The year 12 Hijri dawned on March 18, 633, with Arabia united under the central authority of the Caliph at Medina. This campaign was Abu Bakr's greatest political and military triumph, and was a complete success.

Aftermath
With the collapse of the rebellions, Abu Bakr gained control of the entire Arabian Peninsula. He decided to expand the caliphate. It is unclear whether his intention was to mount a full-scale expansion, or preemptive attacks to secure a buffer zone between the Islamic state and the powerful Sasanian and Byzantine empires. This set the stage for the Islamic conquest of Persia.
Khalid was sent to Persia with an army consisting of 18,000 volunteers, and conquered the richest province of Persia: Iraq. Thereafter, Abu Bakr sent his armies to invade Roman Syria, an important province of the Byzantine Empire.

Third rebellion in Yemen 
At some point during the rule of Umar ibn al-Khat'tab, the second caliph, the people of Yemen revolted once again under the leadership of a man named Ghayth ibn Abd Yaghuth. The avowed aim of the apostates was to drive the Muslims out of Yemen by assassinating Fairoz and other important Muslim leaders.  Fairoz somehow escaped and took shelter in the mountains in June or July 632.  For the next six months Fairoz remained in his stronghold, during which time he was joined by thousands of Yemeni Muslims. When he felt strong enough, Fairoz marched to San'a and defeated Qais, who retreated with his remaining men northeast to Abyan, where they all surrendered and were subsequently pardoned by the caliph. On the other side, Uthman ibn Abi al-As also dispatched a force from Ta'if against rebel clans from the tribes of Azd and Bajila in Yemen. He later also contributed a twenty-man force from the city under the command of his brother to assist Medina's war efforts in Yemen. Abu Bakr kept Uthman in his post as did his successor Caliph Umar

See also
Arab-Byzantine wars
Jahiliyyah
Pre-Islamic Arabia
Religion in pre-Islamic Arabia

References

Notes

Sources

Further reading
 
Fred McGraw Donner: The Early Islamic Conquests. Princeton University Press, 1986.
 Elias S. Shoufani: Al-Riddah and the Muslim conquest of Arabia. Toronto, 1973. 
 Meir J. Kister: The struggle against Musaylima and the conquest of Yamama. In: Jerusalem Studies in Arabic and Islam, 27 (2002)
 Ella Landau-Tasseron: The Participation of Tayyi in the Ridda. In: Jerusalem Studies in Arabic and Islam, 5 (1984)

External links
 

 
Wars of the Middle Ages
Apostasy in Islam
632
633
630s conflicts